Leptothorax athabasca has been discovered and described by Buschinger, A. & Schulz, A. in 2008. It is endemic to the area around Athabasca Falls in Alberta, Canada.

References

athabasca
Insects described in 2008

Endemic fauna of Canada